Associazione Sportiva Dilettantistica Polisportiva Calcio Budoni is an Italian association football club based in Budoni, Sardinia. Founded in 1973, tt currently plays in Serie D.

History
The club was founded in 1973.

In the 2002–13 season it plays in Serie D for the 5th consecutive year.

Colors and badge 
The team's colors are white and light blue.

References

External links
Official homepage

Football clubs in Italy
Football clubs in Sardinia
Association football clubs established in 1973
1973 establishments in Italy